Brain-specific serine protease 4 (BSSP-4), also known as serine protease 22 or tryptase epsilon, is an enzyme that in humans is encoded by the PRSS22 gene.

This gene encodes a member of the trypsin family of serine proteases. The enzyme is expressed in the airways in a developmentally regulated manner. The gene is part of a cluster of serine protease genes on chromosome 16.

See also 
 tryptase

References

Further reading

EC 3.4.21